Exhibition of Female Flagellants is an 1830 pornographic novel published by George Cannon in London and attributed, probably falsely, to Theresa Berkley. The principal activity described is flagellation, mainly of women by women, described in a theatrical, fetishistic style. It was republished around 1872 by John Camden Hotten in his series The Library Illustrative of Social Progress, attributed to Theresa Berkley.

References

British erotic novels
British pornography
1830 British novels
BDSM literature
Books about flagellation